Argeo Quadri (23 March 1911 – 14 April 2004) was an Italian conductor best known for his work with Italian and French opera.  From 1957 he was largely resident at the Vienna State Opera.  A native of Como, he graduated from the Milan Conservatory in 1933.

Biography
Quadri was born in Como on 23 March 1911. He graduated from the Milan Conservatory in 1933. He conducted a range of operas, including Verdi's Rigoletto and Ballo in maschera at Covent Garden in the mid-1950s. From 1957, he was largely resident at the Vienna State Opera. He died on 14 April 2004 in Milan.

References
James Anderson, The Complete Dictionary of Opera and Operetta.
Boston Globe obituary

External links

1911 births
2004 deaths
Italian male conductors (music)
People from Como
Milan Conservatory alumni
20th-century Italian conductors (music)
20th-century Italian male musicians